Víctor Rubén López (born 19 December 1978) is an Argentine former footballer who last played for Instituto de Córdoba in the Primera B Nacional. His usual position was centre back.

Career

López started his professional career at Racing de Córdoba in the lower leagues of Argentine football, in 1998. In 2000, he joined Talleres de Córdoba who were in the Argentine Primera División at the time. In 2004, Talleres was relegated and López joined Arsenal de Sarandí.

In 2007, López joined Real Sociedad in Spain, where he suffered relegation for the 2nd time in his career at the end of the 2006–2007 season.

In 2008, López returned to Argentina to play for Banfield. In Banfield, he was a key member of the squad that won the Argentine championship for the first time in the history of the club, featuring in every game of the Apertura 2009 championship and scoring a key goal in the 18th round against Tigre.

In 2016, López joined Atletico Rafaela to play at the orders of Jorge Burruchaga.

Honours
Banfield
Primera División: Apertura 2009

Newell's Old Boys
Primera División: 2013 Final

References

External links
 Guardian statistics
 Argentine Primera statistics at Fútbol XXI 

1978 births
Living people
Footballers from Córdoba, Argentina
Argentine footballers
Argentine sportspeople of Spanish descent
Racing de Córdoba footballers
Talleres de Córdoba footballers
Instituto footballers
Arsenal de Sarandí footballers
Club Atlético Banfield footballers
Atlético de Rafaela footballers
Real Sociedad footballers
La Liga players
Segunda División players
Argentine Primera División players
Primera Nacional players
Torneo Argentino A players
Argentine expatriate sportspeople in Spain
Association football defenders